Hugh Talbot Patrick (May 11, 1860 in New Philadelphia, Ohio – January 1, 1939) was an American neurologist.

Patrick graduated in medicine from the Bellevue Hospital Medical College in 1884. In 1891, he traveled to Europe where he studied neurology in Berlin under Emanuel Mendel. In 1898, he was appointed Associate Professor at the medical school of Northwestern University. Patrick is Founder of the Chicago Neurological Society.

Personal life
Hugh Talbot Patrick was married April 28, 1896 to Fannie E. Gary. They had three children: Talbot, Catherine, and Elizabeth Patrick.

Works
The Bryson Symptom in Exophthalmic Goitre (1895)
Remarks on Spinal Irritation (1897)
Anaesthesia of the Trunk in Locomotor Ataxia (1897)
Parkinson's Disease. A Clinical Study of One Hundred and Forty-six Cases

Bibliography
 Lewis J. Pollock. Hugh Talbot Patrick 1860-1939. Am J Psychiatry 95:1257-1258, 1939

References

External links
 

American neurologists
1939 deaths
1860 births
People from New Philadelphia, Ohio